The Suzuki GS150R is a 150cc motorcycle from Suzuki Motorcycle India. The bike was launched in November 2008. With the GS150R, Suzuki Motorcycle India entered the highly competitive 150  cc segment of the Indian motorcycle market. Suzuki Motorcycle India states that the bike falls "in-between" the two classes of Indian 150  cc motorcycles, namely commuter class and premium class. The GS150R has a sixth gear for cruising on highways.

Awards
The GS150R has been named the ‘Motorcycle of the Year 2010 up to 160cc' by NDTV Profit's Car Bike Awards 2010.

A relatively traditional variant; the Suzuki GS150 motorcycle is manufactured by Pak Suzuki and sold in Pakistan under the GS150 brand name. A similar version is sold in the Philippines as Suzuki Mola 150. It is equipped with a Single cylinder four-stroke motor which produces a maximum peak output power of 13.8 hp and has a dry weight of 114 kg. Suzuki GS150 has a Steel frame with front suspension being Telescopic fork, coil spring, oil damped and at the rear, it is equipped with Swing-arm, coil spring, oil damped. Stock tire sizes are 2.75-18 on the front and 3.00-18 on the rear. As for stopping power, the Suzuki GS150 braking system includes Disk Brake at the front wheel and Expanding brake (drum brake) at the rear wheel. Overall, the styling of this bike and a relatively flat seat, are more suited to the traditional sitting posture of women in Pakistan who sit behind the rider with both legs on one side.

External links
 Official site at Suzuki India
 Pak Suzuki GS150 Official Website
 Pak Suzuki GS150 Specs
 Suzuki GS150 Older Model Specs
 Suzuki Mola 150 Specs

GS150R
Motorcycles introduced in 2008